Sin-e may refer to:

 Xinyi, a former county and present county-level city in Guangdong, China
 Other places now romanized as Xinyi
 Sin-é, a defunct club in Manhattan, New York